The 1939 World Table Tennis Championships men's doubles was the 13th edition of the men's doubles championship.
Viktor Barna and Richard Bergmann won the title after defeating Miloslav Hamr and Josef Tartakower in the final by three sets to two.

Only 11 men's teams and 5 women's teams entered the Championships. Hungary, the United States and Austria were the major nations missing. The eventual doubles champions Viktor Barna and Richard Bergmann played under the England flag for the first time after fleeing the Nazis in Europe.

Results

See also
List of World Table Tennis Championships medalists

References

-